The MAZ-203 is a fully low-floor single-decker bus. It is a representative of second generation of MAZ city buses, being a successor of MAZ-103.  It has been built since 2006, there are over 100 models built already. MAZ 203 can be found in Poland, Ukraine, Russia and Romania.  In Serbia, MAZ has been working in cooperation with local-based company BIK (Bus industries Kragujevac) for the manufacture of BIK-203, a bus manufactured on the basis of the platform of MAZ-203.

There is also a trolleybus variant of the MAZ-203 built from 2008, MAZ-ETON T203 with electrical equipment of Eton, Belarus (GTO or IGBT).

See also 

 List of buses

References

External links
 MAZ-203 page on MAZ website 
 50 MAZ-203 supplied to Kazan, Russia
 Photos of MAZ-203 in Gomel, Belarus

Minsk Automobile Plant vehicles
Full-size buses
Low-floor buses
Trolleybuses
Vehicles introduced in 2006